Maximilian II (11 July 1662 – 26 February 1726), also known as Max Emanuel or Maximilian Emanuel, was a Wittelsbach ruler of Bavaria and a Prince-elector of the Holy Roman Empire. He was also the last governor of the Spanish Netherlands and Duke of Luxembourg. An able soldier, his ambition led to conflicts that limited his ultimate dynastic achievements.

He was born in Munich to Ferdinand Maria, Elector of Bavaria and Princess Henriette Adelaide of Savoy (d.1676). His maternal grandparents were Victor Amadeus I of Savoy and Christine of France, daughter of King Henri IV.

War against the Ottoman Empire
Maximilian inherited the elector's mantle while still a minor in 1679 and remained under his uncle Maximilian Philipp's regency until 1680. By 1683 he was already embarked on a military career, fighting in the defence of Vienna against the attempt of the Ottoman Empire to extend their possessions further into Europe. He returned to court for long enough to marry Maria Antonia, daughter of Leopold I, Holy Roman Emperor and Margaret Theresa of Spain, on 15 July 1685 in Vienna, Austria. This marriage was very unhappy since the couple disliked each other, but it was successful in producing the desired heir for both Bavaria and the Spanish monarchy.  Maximilian Emanuel's fame was assured when, in 1688, he led the capture of Belgrade from the Turks, with the full support of Serbian insurgents under the command of Jovan Monasterlija.

Governor of the Spanish Netherlands
In the War of the Grand Alliance he again fought on the Habsburgs' side, protecting the Rhine frontier, and, being the Emperor's son-in-law and the husband of the King of Spain's niece, was appointed governor of the Spanish Netherlands in late 1691.

His Netherlands adventure catalyzed Maximilian Emanuel's dynastic ambitions. One year after his appointment as governor, Maria Antonia died in Vienna, having given birth to a son, Joseph Ferdinand, who was appointed heir to the Spanish monarchy but died before acceding the throne in 1699. An alternative avenue for Maximilian Emanuel's ambition was offered by his marriage on 12 January 1694 to Theresa Kunegunda Sobieska, the death of whose father, the elected King of Poland John III Sobieski, two years later, offered a potential avenue of influence in Polish affairs.

However, he concentrated his interests in Western Europe, making his sons by Theresa Kunegunda Sobieska, Charles Albert and Clemens August, the principal beneficiaries of his ambitions.

The unsuccessful siege and bombardment of Brussels in 1695 during the Nine Years' War by French troops and the resulting fire during Max Emanuel's rule were together the most destructive event in the entire history of Brussels.

War of the Spanish Succession

Maximilian Emanuel, who had married Archduchess Maria Antonia, the sole child of Emperor Leopold's Spanish marriage, was one of the more serious claimants to the Spanish inheritance of Charles II of Spain, and the birth of his son Joseph Ferdinand in October 1692 immediately created a new pretender to the Spanish throne. In October 1698, William III of England and Louis XIV of France concluded the First Partition Treaty, which gave the Spanish crown with the Indies to Joseph Ferdinand, Milan to Emperor Leopold's younger son Archduke Charles, and the rest of Spanish Italy to France. The unexpected death of Joseph Ferdinand four months later voided this plan and in the Second Partition Treaty, the Bavarian portion of the inheritance was allotted to Archduke Charles. By the outbreak of the War of the Spanish Succession in 1701, Maximilian Emanuel, who had long-term imperial aspirations, had hoped that his governorship of the Spanish Netherlands might yet reap the reward of a share of the Spanish inheritance from either Leopold or, failing him, Louis XIV. Allying himself with the French against Austria, his campaign against Tyrol in 1703 did not have success and his plans were then frustrated by the disastrous defeat at the Battle of Blenheim in 1704.

In 1704–05, following the evacuation of the Bavarian court to the Spanish Netherlands after the defeat at the Battle of Blenheim, Max Emanuel's consort apparently was in charge of the government in the Stewardship of Munich of the Electorate of Bavaria as Regent Princess. However, when Theresa Kunegunda had found love letters of the Countess of Arco, a mistress of Max Emanuel, she left Munich to see her mother in Venice. The army would not allow her to return. In the ensuing evacuation of his court to the Netherlands, Maximilian Emanuel's family became separated and his sons were held prisoners for several years in Austria, Klemens August being brought up by Jesuits. Bavaria was partitioned between Austria and Johann Wilhelm, Elector Palatine. The harsh Austrian administration which managed to extract massive amounts of money and manpower from Bavaria led to a serious peasant uprising within a year.

Maximilian Emanuel was again forced to flee the Netherlands after the Battle of Ramillies on 23 May 1706 and found refuge at the French court in Versailles where his late sister Maria Anna (1660–1690) had been the wife of the Grand Dauphin. In 1712, Luxemburg and Namur were ceded to Maximilian Emanuel by his French allies, a cession that was not definitive since France was only the occupant of what was still the Spanish Netherlands. The war between France and Austria finally ended in 1714 in the Treaty of Rastatt in which Louis XIV compelled Austria to implement the full restoration of his faithful ally Maximilian Emanuel, including the return of the Upper Palatinate. Maximilian Emanuel was to remain in possession of Luxemburg, Namur and Charleroi until he was restored.

Final years in Bavaria

Back in Bavaria, Maximilian Emanuel focused on architecture projects to balance the failure of his political ambitions. It was bitter for him to witness the royal elevation of the German princes Augustus II the Strong (1697), Frederick I of Prussia (1701) and George I of Hanover (1714) as well as of his cousin Victor Amadeus II of Sardinia (1713) while his own political dreams could not be realized.

Maximilian Emanuel then supported the new wars of the Habsburg against the Turks with Bavarian auxiliary forces (1717).

In 1724, he created a union of all lines of the Wittelsbach dynasty to increase the influence of his house. The Wittelsbach prince-electors Max Emanuel, his son Clemens August of Cologne, Charles III Philip, Elector Palatine and Franz Ludwig of Trier had at that time four votes at their disposal for the next imperial election. The crown of the Holy Roman Empire was sought for either Max Emanuel or his son Charles Albert. Already in 1722 Charles Albert had been married to the Habsburg princess Maria Amalia of Austria.

In 1726, Max Emanuel died of a stroke. He is buried in the crypt of the Theatinerkirche in Munich.

Cultural legacy

During his entire reign Maximilian II Emanuel patronized the arts. As governor of the Spanish Netherlands he acquired numerous Dutch and Flemish paintings for the Wittelsbach collection.

The first half of Max Emanuel's reign was still dominated by his parents' Italian court artists, like Enrico Zuccalli and Giovanni Antonio Viscardi. Between 1684 and 1688, Zuccalli built Italian style Lustheim Palace for Max Emanuel and his first wife Maria Antonia, located on a central island. With the appointment of Joseph Effner serving as chief architect of the court and the young François de Cuvilliés as his assistant, the French influence significantly increased and Max Emanuel's return in 1715 marked the origin of the era of Bavarian Rococo.

The Nymphenburg Palace was enlarged, the Dachau Palace redesigned, and the new Schleissheim Palace was finally completed (1726) during Max Emanuel's reign. These palaces were connected with a network of canals as Max Emanuel had become acquainted with in the Netherlands. Between 1715 and 1717, he had the Baroque style Fürstenried Palace built by Effner as a hunting lodge which was the extension and modification of an already existing noble mansion.

Marriages and issue
First marriage with Maria Antonia of Austria, daughter of Emperor Leopold I, Holy Roman Emperor:
 Leopold Ferdinand (b. and d. 1689)
 Anton (b. and d. 1690)
 Joseph Ferdinand (1692–1699)

Second marriage with Theresa Kunegunda Sobieska of Poland, daughter of King John III Sobieski:

 Stillborn child (1695)
 Maria Anna Karoline (1696–1750), since 1720 a nun
 Charles Albert (1697–1745), elector of Bavaria, King of Bohemia and Holy Roman Emperor,  ∞ 1722 Maria Amalia Josepha Anna of Austria (1701–1756)
 Philipp Moritz Maria (1698–1719), elected bishop of Paderborn and Münster
 Ferdinand Maria (1699–1738), imperial general
 Clemens August (1700–1761), Grand Master of the Teutonic Order, Prince Archbishop of Cologne, Bishop of Regensburg, Paderborn, Osnabrück, Hildesheim and Münster
 Wilhelm (1701–1704)
 Alois Johann Adolf (1702–1705)
 Johann Theodor (1703–1763), Cardinal, Prince bishop of Regensburg, Freising and Liege
 Maximilian Emanuel Thomas (1704–1709)

He had an illegitimate child with his French mistress Agnes Françoise Louchier;

Emmanuel François Joseph, Count of Bavaria (1695–1747) had two children with Maria Josepha Karolina von Hohenfels; also had an affair with Louise Anne de Bourbon, grand daughter of Madame de Montespan.

Ancestry

References

Sources

 Ludwig Hüttl: Max Emanuel. Der Blaue Kurfürst 1679–1726. Eine politische Biographie. Munich: Süddeutscher Verlag, 1976.  
Christian Probst: Lieber bayrisch sterben. Der bayrische Volksaufstand der Jahre 1705 und 1706. Munich: Süddeutscher Verlag, 1978.  
Marcus Junkelmann: Kurfürst Max Emanuel von Bayern als Feldherr. Munich: Herbert Utz Verlag, 2000.  

1662 births
1726 deaths
17th-century prince-electors of Bavaria
18th-century prince-electors of Bavaria
Nobility from Munich
Candidates for the Polish elective throne
Governors of the Habsburg Netherlands
Maximilian II Emanuel, Elector of Bavaria
German Roman Catholics
German army commanders in the War of the Spanish Succession
German art collectors
20th-century art collectors
18th-century art collectors
Knights of the Golden Fleece
People of the Great Turkish War
Burials at the Theatine Church, Munich
Military personnel of the Holy Roman Empire
German military personnel of the Nine Years' War